Idahosa is a surname. Notable people with the surname include:

Benson Idahosa (1938–1998), Nigerian religious leader
Helen Idahosa (born 1972), Nigerian weightlifter
Margaret Idahosa (born 1943), Nigerian religious leader, wife of Benson

Surnames of Nigerian origin